Niz Juluki, also known as Nij-Juluki, is a village in Barama Tehsil of Baksa district (earlier Nalbari district), Assam, India. As per 2011 Census of India, Niz Juluki village has a population of 3,064 people with 80.29% literacy rate.

References 

Villages in Nalbari district